1929 Emperor's Cup Final was the 9th final of the Emperor's Cup competition. The final was played at Meiji Jingu Gaien Stadium in Tokyo on November 1, 1929. Kwangaku Club won the championship.

Overview
Kwangaku Club won their 1st title, by defeating Hosei University 3–0. Kwangaku Club was featured a squad consisting of Saizo Saito, Yukio Goto and Hideo Sakai.

Match details

See also
1929 Emperor's Cup

References

Emperor's Cup
1929 in Japanese football